Stadnik or Stadnyk is a gender-neutral Slavic surname that may refer to

Alina Stadnyk (born 1991), Ukrainian wrestler
Andriy Stadnik (born 1982), Ukrainian wrestler
Hanna Stadnik (1929–2020), Polish activist
Leonid Stadnyk (1970–2014), Ukrainian giant
Mariya Stadnik (born 1988), Ukrainian-Azerbaijani wrestler, wife of Andriy
Mike Stadnyk (born 1986), Canadian football defensive end
Victoria Stadnik (born 1979), Ukrainian rhythmic gymnast

See also
 
 

Ukrainian-language surnames
Polish-language surnames